George Cecil Horry (6 May 1907 – 29 April 1981) was a British-born New Zealand criminal, confidence trickster, tailor and convicted murderer.

In 1951, he became the first person in more than 300 years to be convicted under English common law for the murder of a victim of whose  body was never found.

He had emigrated with his family to New Zealand in 1921, and from 1923 he accumulated a series of convictions and in 1938 was declared a "habitual criminal;". He married in 1935 and twice in 1942. The first marriage in 1942 was to Mary Eileen Jones. A week after the wedding he told her parents that she had been lost at sea when their ship was torpedoed in the Atlantic Ocean, but they were suspicious and reported her disappearance to the police. Detective Sergeant William Fell established that "George Turner" (supposed to be wealthy and an agent of the British government who was returning to Britain) was, in fact, George Cecil Horry, and persuaded the Crown solicitor in Auckland that the case was strong enough to go to trial. He was arrested in 1951.

By 1951 when he was arrested he had accumulated 64 convictions (and been conscripted into the New Zealand Army in 1944). The jury accepted the circumstantial evidence and found him guilty; though the death penalty for murder had been restored it was not in force in 1942 so he was not hanged. Although one of the officers who interviewed Horry in 1943 had retired, his written record of the interview enabled him to recall the details.

He died in Auckland as "George Taylor" (having changed his name by deed poll), leaving a wife and child.

References

1907 births
1942 murders in New Zealand
1981 deaths
New Zealand people convicted of murder
People convicted of murder by New Zealand
People from Sheffield
New Zealand tailors
New Zealand fraudsters
Murder convictions without a body
New Zealand military personnel of World War II
British emigrants to New Zealand
Criminals from Yorkshire